KCXX-FM (103.9 FM, "97.9 & 103.9 Sunny FM") is a radio station with a classic hits music format owned by William W. McCutchen III. It is licensed to Comanche, Texas.

References

External links

CXX
Radio stations established in 2016
2016 establishments in Texas